Heitor Villa-Lobos's Étude No. 9, part of his Twelve Études for Guitar, was first published by Max Eschig, Paris, in 1953.

Structure
The piece is in F-sharp minor and is marked Très peu animé, and evokes the nostalgic countryside atmosphere associated with the cavaquinho.

Analysis

Étude No. 9 is a study in arpeggios and slurred notes, developing musical ideas by Carcassi and Carulli. There is an emphasis on thirds, as in the Fifth Étude.

References

Cited sources

Further reading
 Villa-Lobos, sua obra. 1989. Third edition. Rio de Janeiro: MinC-SPHAN/Pró-Memória, Museu Villa-Lobos. Online edition, 2009
 Wright, Simon. 1992. Villa-Lobos. Oxford Studies of Composers. Oxford and New York: Oxford University Press.  (cloth);  (pbk).

Compositions by Heitor Villa-Lobos
Guitar études
Compositions in F-sharp minor